Ercheia latistria is a species of moth of the family Erebidae. It is found in Indonesia, where it has been recorded from Halmahera (Maluku Islands).

References

Moths described in 1919
Ercheiini
Moths of Indonesia